Caloptilia burserella is a moth of the family Gracillariidae. It is known from Cuba and Florida in the United States.

The larvae feed on Bursera gummifera, Bursera simaruba and Persea americana. They mine the leaves of their host plant. The mine has the form of a small triangular mine between the midrib and another rib. It is found on the underside of the leaf.

References

burserella
Moths of North America
Moths described in 1900